Samuel Williamson (born 19 December 1997) is an Australian international swimmer. He has represented Australia at the 2022 Commonwealth Games and won one gold, two silver and a bronze medal.

Biography
Williamson is from Melbourne. He was selected for the 2022 Commonwealth Games in Birmingham, where he competed in the men's 50m metres breastroke, reaching the final and winning a silver medal. He also reached the final of the 100m breaststroke and won a bronze medal.

At the 2022 Australian Short Course Swimming Championships, held in Sydney in August, Williamson won the gold medal in the 50 meter breaststroke, 100 meter breaststroke, and 200 meter breaststroke.

References

External links
 
 
 
 

1997 births
Living people
Australian male swimmers
Sportsmen from Victoria (Australia)
Commonwealth Games competitors for Australia
Commonwealth Games medallists in swimming
Commonwealth Games silver medallists for Australia
Commonwealth Games bronze medallists for Australia
Swimmers at the 2022 Commonwealth Games
21st-century Australian people
People from Mount Waverley, Victoria
Swimmers from Melbourne
Medallists at the 2022 Commonwealth Games